Octobot may refer to:

 Octobot (robot) - soft-bodied robot
 Octobot from Sonic the Hedgehog
 Octobots from Doctor Octopus